Sankara Krishna Chettur (1905-1972) was an Indian civil servant  who served as Chief Secretary of Madras State from 1960 to 1964. He was the nephew of Sir C. Sankaran Nair.

References 

Tamil Nadu politicians
1905 births
1972 deaths